Murder in My Mind is a 1997 science fiction crime drama film directed by Robert Iscove and starring Nicollette Sheridan, Stacy Keach, Peter Outerbridge, Peter Coyote, Ian Tracey and Peter Flemming. It was written by Tom Swale.

Plot

When a serial killer preys on blondes, a blonde federal law enforcement officer investigating the case decides to take a drastic step. Her husband, a scientist experimenting only on lab animals, transplants brain cells from a comatose patient into the agent's brain, hoping it will stimulate memories that will help her find the killer.

Cast
 Nicollette Sheridan as FBI Agent Pearson
 Peter Coyote as Lefcoat
 Stacy Keach as Cargill
 Peter Outerbridge as Belinas

External links

1990s crime drama films
Films directed by Robert Iscove
Films scored by Michel Colombier
1990s science fiction films
1997 films